Magnolia Cafe is a restaurant with one active location in Austin, Texas, in the United States. The restaurant at Lake Austin opened as Omelettry West in 1979, and became known as Magnolia Cafe during 1986–1987. The South Congress restaurant opened in 1988. The Lake Austin location closed in 2020, during the COVID-19 pandemic, but the South Congress location remains open.

Magnolia Cafe used to operate 24/7 and served breakfast as well as Tex-Mex entrees like enchiladas and spinach lasagna and quesadillas, migas, pancakes, and potato scrambles. Its remaining location operates on a reduced schedule.

See also

 COVID-19 pandemic in Texas
 Impact of the COVID-19 pandemic on the restaurant industry in the United States
 List of Diners, Drive-Ins and Dives episodes
 List of Tex-Mex restaurants

References

External links
 
 Magnolia Café at Fodor's
 Magnolia Cafe at the Food Network
 Magnolia Cafe at Zagat

1979 establishments in Texas
Restaurants established in 1979
Tex-Mex restaurants